Wonderful Things: Retrospective is a two-CD compilation album by Australian indie rock/electronic band Underground Lovers, released in 2001. The album is a 30-track retrospective spanning their entire recording career: while the first disc contains album tracks from Leaves Me Blind (1992) to Cold Feeling (1998), the second contains tracks from CD singles and EPs including a 1990 vinyl single.

The album includes a previously unreleased Japanese-language version of "Holiday"—a song originally on Leaves Me Blind—and also has three remixes of Underground Lovers album tracks. One of those remixes, "Losin' Brunehilda", featured remixing, additional production and rhythm and keyboard programming by Robert Goodge, a former member of Melbourne electronica band Essendon Airport, while "Your Eyes Remix" was remixed by Goodge and former bandmate David Chesworth, with both also sharing rhythm and keyboard programming credits. "Rushall Station Remix", which also credited Goodge for samples and programming, was remixed by dance production duo Sonic Animation—Rupert Keiller and Adrian Cartwright. The track had earlier appeared on Whitey Trickstar, a 1997 album by GBVG, a side project of Underground Lovers founders Glenn Bennie and Vincent Giarrusso.

The album was two years in the making, with all songs remastered by the band's original engineer, Don Bartley.

Track listing

References

2011 compilation albums
Compilation albums by Australian artists
Underground Lovers albums